is a private university in Shinjuku, Tokyo, Japan. Established in 1923, it was chartered as a women's junior college in 1963, and opened as a four-year university in 1994. The school also has facilities in Saitama, Saitama Prefecture, including the Iwatsuki Campus and the National Saitama Hospital Campus.

History 

Mejiro University was founded as Kenshin Gakuen (Kenshin Academy) in Ochiai, Tokyo City (present-day Shinjuku, Tokyo) by businessman and politician Satō Jūen (1187-1964) and his wife Fuyu in April 1923. The predecessor of the school was founded 1918 in Kumamoto, Kumamoto Prefecture. Satō Jūen served as the first president of the academy. In 1930, Mejiro Commercial School was established.

In 1963, Mejiro Women's Junior College and the Department of English Literature were established, and the next year, the departments of Japanese Literature and Human Life Science were established.

In 1994, Mejiro University was established as a university with the Faculty of Humanities, Department of Regional Culture Studies and Department of Linguistics and Cultural Studies. The Iwatsuki Campus was established in Iwatsuki, Saitama Prefecture the same year. In 1999, Mejiro University Graduate School was established with the Graduate School of International Studies.

Between 2002 and 2007, the university established the faculties of Foreign Languages, Business Administration, Health Sciences, and Nursing, as well as the graduate schools of Psychology, Business Administration, and Life Welfare. In 2008, the Mejiro University Clinic was established, and in 2009, the National Saitama Hospital Campus was established in Wakō, Saitama Prefecture.

The Graduate School of Rehabilitation was established in 2012, and the Faculty of Media was established in 2018. In 2020, the Faculty of Psychology was established.

Organization

Faculties 

 Faculty of Psychology
 Faculty of Human Studies
 Faculty of Sociology
 Faculty of Media
 Faculty of Business Administration
 Faculty of Foreign Languages
 Faculty of Health Sciences
 Faculty of Nursing

Graduate Schools 

 Graduate School of Psychology
 Graduate School of Business Administration
 Graduate School of International Studies
 Graduate School of Social Work Services
 Graduate School of Language and Culture Studies
 Graduate School of Nursing
 Graduate School of Rehabilitation

Notable people

Notable staff 

 Agnes Chan, affiliate professor, singer
 Natsue Washizu, professor, singer

Notable alumni 

 Yuu Kashii, actress
 Neko Hiroshi, comedian and marathon runner
 Nachu, media personality
 Ōsaki Hatsune, professional Mahjong player

External links
 Official website 
 
 Official website 
  
 
 Shinjuku campus (Tokyo)
 Iwatsuki campus (Saitama)

References

Educational institutions established in 1918
Private universities and colleges in Japan
Universities and colleges in Tokyo
1918 establishments in Japan